Pistachio ice cream or pistachio nut ice cream is an ice cream flavor made with pistachio nuts or flavoring. It is often distinctively green in color. Pistachio is also a flavor of sorbet and gelato. Pistachio ice cream is a layer in spumoni.

At the Bakdash in Damascus, Syria, a pounded ice cream covered with pistachio called Booza is produced. It has an elastic texture made of mastic and sahlab and is famous around the Arab World. Tripoli's Al Mina district is known for its Arabic ice cream including "ashta" with pistachios.

It is widely produced including by Brigham's Ice Cream, Ben & Jerry's, Graeter's and major brands.

Gallery

References

Flavors of ice cream